This is a list of diplomatic missions in Saudi Arabia. There are currently 114 embassies in Riyadh. Several countries have diplomatic missions accredited from other capitals. In addition, many countries maintain consulates in other Saudi Arabian cities such as Jeddah and Dhahran (not including honorary consulates).

Embassies in Riyadh 

 
 
 

 

 

 

 

 
 

 
 
 

 

 

 

 

 (Embassy)

 

 

 (Embassy)

Other diplomatic offices in Riyadh 
 (Interests Section, Switzerland is protecting power)
 (Taipei Economic and Cultural Representative Office in the Kingdom of Saudi Arabia)
 (Delegation)

Consulates General

Dhahran

Jeddah 

 (Consulate)

 (Consulate)
 (Consulate)

 (Consulate)

 (Consulate)

Accredited missions 

 (London)
 (Abu Dhabi)
 (Abu Dhabi) 
 (New York City)
 (Kuwait City)
 (London)
 (Cairo)
 (New Delhi)
 (Cairo)
 (Abu Dhabi)
 (Rome)
 (Abu Dhabi)
 (Cairo)
 (Cairo) 
 (Cairo)
 (Abu Dhabi)
 (Cairo)
 (Doha)
 (Abu Dhabi)
 (New York City)
 (Abu Dhabi)
 (Abu Dhabi)
 (Kuwait City)
 (Algiers)
 (Rome)
 (Kuwait City)
 (London)
 (Kuwait City)
 (New York City)
 (New Delhi)
 (Cairo)
 (Cairo)
 (Cairo)
 (New York City)
 (Ankara)
 (Abu Dhabi)
 (Kuwait City)
 (Cairo)
 (Kuwait City)
 (Kuwait City)
 (Cairo)
 (New Delhi)
 (Beirut)
 (Abu Dhabi)
 (Canberra)
 (Brussels)
 (Jakarta)
 (Cairo)
 (Cairo)
 (Addis Ababa)
 (Rabat)
 (Abu Dhabi)
 (Jakarta)
 (Canberra)
 (Kuwait City)

Former embassies

See also 
 List of diplomatic missions of Saudi Arabia
 Foreign relations of Saudi Arabia

References

External links 

 Saudi Arabian Ministry of Foreign Affairs
 Diplomatic list

Diplomatic missions in Saudi Arabia
Diplomatic missions
Saudi Arabia